Eugène Duflot (9 May 1885 – 11 March 1957) was a French sports shooter. He competed in two events at the 1924 Summer Olympics.

References

External links
 

1885 births
1957 deaths
French male sport shooters
Olympic shooters of France
Shooters at the 1924 Summer Olympics
Sportspeople from Aisne